The following teams took part in the Division III tournament, which was played at Dundalk, Ireland from April 15, 2007 through April 21, 2007. Mongolia made their debut at the World Championships during this tournament.

Standings

 Ireland and New Zealand were promoted to Division II.
 Armenia withdrew, so they were relegated to the Division III qualification.

Results

Scoring leaders

References

IIHF World Championship Division III
4
ice
ice
ice
2007